Coppers may refer to:

 Butterflies from the subfamily Lycaeninae
 Police officers
 Coppers (film), a 2019 Canadian documentary film
 Coppers (Belgian TV series) or Rough Justice, a 2015 Belgian crime TV series 
 Coppers (UK TV series), a 2010 and 2012 British documentary series about policing in the United Kingdom
 Rome Coppers, a 2007 American baseball team of the New York State League
Copper Face Jacks, nightclub in Dublin, Ireland
 Vermont copper, an 18th-century copper coin minted by the Vermont Republic until admission to the United States
 Coins of the pound sterling, collectively 1p and 2p decimal coins, due to their copper plating

See also
 Copper (disambiguation)
 Koppers (surname)
 Koppers